Horama oedippus is a moth of the subfamily Arctiinae. It was described by Jean Baptiste Boisduval in 1870. It is found in Mexico and Guatemala.

References

 

Euchromiina
Moths described in 1870